The London Midland and Scottish Railway Class 2P 4-4-0 was a class of steam locomotive designed for light passenger work.

Overview 

The class was introduced in 1928 and was a post-grouping development of the Midland Railway 483 Class with modified dimensions and reduced boiler mountings.

The numbering continued from where the Midland engines left off at 563 and eventually reached 700. 138 were built, though numbering is slightly complicated by renumberings and transfers.

Details 

Numbers 633 and 653 were fitted with Dabeg feedwater heater in 1933. Numbers 591 and 639 were withdrawn in 1934 after being heavily damaged in an accident at Port Eglinton Junction near Cumberland Street Station, Glasgow on 6 September of the same year. After nationalisation in 1948, British Railways added 40000 to the numbers of the remaining 136 engines.  Further withdrawals came between 1954 and 1962.  All were scrapped.

Models 
Hornby produce a 00 gauge model based on the old Dapol (formerly Airfix) tooling which is reasonably accurate. Graham Farish produced an N gauge model of the 4P 4-4-0 Compound when they were in Poole, Dorset, and the chassis for this could be modified to represent the 2P. Union Mills on the Isle of Man make a 2P in N gauge.

References

External links

 Class 2P-B Details at Rail UK

2P 4-4-0
4-4-0 locomotives
Railway locomotives introduced in 1928
Scrapped locomotives
Standard gauge steam locomotives of Great Britain
2′B h2 locomotives
Passenger locomotives